Kieran Lewis born 10 June 1980 is an Irish former rugby union footballer for St Mary's Rugby Club. He previously played for both Munster and Leinster. He played at Centre. He is the current backs coach for St Mary's third XV.

He obtained 3 caps for Ireland.

References

External links
Munster profile

1980 births
Living people
Irish rugby union coaches
Irish rugby union players
St Mary's College RFC players
Garryowen Football Club players
Munster Rugby players
Rugby union centres
Rugby union wings
Ireland international rugby union players
People educated at St Mary's College, Dublin